Viktor Hromov (born February 3, 1965) is a Ukrainian former football forward.

External links

Profile.
Profile

1965 births
Living people
Ukrainian footballers
Soviet footballers
Ukrainian Premier League players
FC Pivdenstal Yenakiyeve players
FC Torpedo Zaporizhzhia players
FC Mariupol players
FC Shakhtar Pavlohrad players
FC Kryvbas Kryvyi Rih players
FC Metalurh Zaporizhzhia players
FC Metalurh-2 Zaporizhzhia players
FC Oleksandriya players

Association football forwards